Toilet is a 2010 English-language Japanese-Canadian drama film written and directed by Naoko Ogigami and starring Alex House and Tatiana Maslany.

Plot

Cast
Masako Motai as Botchin
Alex House as Ray
Tatiana Maslany as Lisa
David Rendall as Maury

Production
Although the story is set in the United States, the film was shot in Toronto.

References

External links
 
 

English-language Japanese films
Japanese drama films
Films shot in Toronto
English-language Canadian films
Canadian drama films
Films directed by Naoko Ogigami
2010s English-language films
2010s Canadian films
2010s Japanese films